Allan John Clarke (born 31 July 1946), nicknamed "Sniffer", is a former professional footballer who played in the Football League for Walsall, Fulham, Leicester City, Leeds United and Barnsley, and won 19 international caps for England.

Club career

Early career
Clarke was born in Short Heath, Willenhall, Staffordshire. Starting his career at Walsall, he made his debut in October 1963 against Reading. He moved to Fulham in March 1966 in a transfer deadline deal. Such was his early promise that Leicester City paid £150,000 for Clarke in 1968, a then record British transfer fee. He spent just one season at Leicester City, in which he scored the winning goal in the 1969 FA Cup semi final, knocking out the team he had supported as a boy – West Bromwich Albion. He also starred in the final, which Leicester City lost 1–0 to Manchester City.

Leeds United
On 24 June 1969, Leeds United manager Don Revie paid £165,000 to Leicester City for Clarke's services, again breaking the record British transfer fee paid by his previous club. Clarke scored 26 goals in his first season at Leeds and earned the nickname "Sniffer", because of his predatory instincts in front of goal – if there was even the remotest goal scoring opportunity, Clarke would "sniff" it out. Leeds United chased a dream "treble" of League championship, FA Cup and European Cup though ultimately they won nothing. Clarke hit the post in the FA Cup Final at Wembley (with strike partner Mick Jones following up to score the rebound) and then went on a run through several Chelsea defenders in the replay to set up a goal for Jones again, but Leeds United still lost. The title had already gone to Everton who had clinched the title several weeks before the end of the season, and the European Cup campaign ended with defeat to Celtic in the semi-final.(0–1 at Elland Road and 1–2 at Hampden Park)

Clarke was in the Leeds United side which won its second Fairs Cup in 1971 – scoring in the final against Juventus – while again missing out on the League Championship in the last week of the season and losing to Colchester United in the fifth round of the FA Cup (after which he was told by club medics that he was suffering from pleurisy).

Leeds United reached the FA Cup Final again in the competition's centenary year and at Wembley they faced Arsenal, the Cup holders. Clarke scored the only goal of the game with a diving header from a Jones cross early in the second half. He had hit the crossbar with another diving header earlier in the game. Unfortunately for Clarke and Leeds, they lost the League title and the chance of emulating Arsenal's previous season "double" when they lost to Wolverhampton Wanderers two days after winning the FA Cup.

Clarke played again at Wembley – and lost – when Leeds United were beaten 1–0 by Sunderland in the 1973 FA Cup Final. Clarke was again Leeds United's top scorer as Leeds United won the league title in 1974, including a run of 29 opening matches without defeat. Leeds United lost the 1975 European Cup Final to Bayern Munich 2–0 and were denied a clear penalty when Clarke was tackled from behind and felled by Franz Beckenbauer in the penalty area.

After this match the Revie side started to break up – their manager had left in 1974 for the England job – and Clarke himself left the club in 1978 after 351 appearances and 151 goals, with a knee injury curtailing his ability to play at top-flight level. He scored in the 1977 FA Cup semi-final, but the game ended 2–1 to Manchester United.

International career
Clarke was called up for England's 1970 World Cup squad in Mexico, despite being uncapped. He made his debut for his country against Czechoslovakia in the heat and pressure of a World Cup first round match. Clarke scored the only goal of the match from the penalty spot. He remains the last England player to make his international debut in a World Cup finals match. Over the next five years he appeared a total of 19 times for England, scoring ten goals. England reached the quarter-finals of the European Football Championships in 1972 but did not get through their qualifying group for the 1976 tournament, or for the 1974 World Cup.

In 1973, he was in the England team which needed to beat Poland at Wembley to qualify for the 1974 World Cup. A goal down, England were awarded a penalty from which Clarke scored, but, other than that, he was among many England players to be thwarted by the Polish goalkeeper Jan Tomaszewski. A 1–1 draw was not enough and England did not go through to play in the 1974 World Cup.

Managerial career
Clarke was appointed Barnsley player-manager on 31 May 1978 and under him they won promotion to the old third Division in May 1979, Clarke scoring 12 goals himself that season including a hat-trick against Port Vale on Boxing Day. On 29 December 1979, Barnsley lost 7–0 at Reading and Clarke decided to end his playing career. He took his players down Woolley Colliery to show them what they could have been doing for a living. Clarke then began to bring in new players such as Trevor Aylott and Derrick Parker and Ian Evans and Barnsley finished mid-table. Leeds United asked Clarke to come back as manager in September 1980. Leeds finished 9th under Clarke at the end of the first season, but the following season, they were beaten 5–1 at Swansea on the opening day, and only won once until October. The club was relegated and Clarke was sacked on 25 June 1982. He then became manager at Scunthorpe United between February 1983 and 24 August 1984, when he and the chairman both resigned. He led Scunthorpe to promotion to the Third Division in May 1983, but a year later they were relegated.

Clarke had another spell at Barnsley between 1 July 1985 and 8 November 1989. Despite having no money to spend, low gates, and being forced to sell players such as David Hirst and John Beresford, Clarke led Barnsley to the fifth round of the FA Cup twice, when they were knocked out by Arsenal in 1987 and Everton in 1989. At the end of 1988–89 season, Barnsley finished just two points off securing a play-off place, losing only twice in the last 17 games. However, in the following season, after a bright start, a bad run saw Barnsley move to 5th from bottom by 4 November. Four days later Clarke was sacked. He was Lincoln City manager for six months but he was sacked on 30 November 1990 to be replaced by Steve Thompson. After a spell scouting for Derby County, Clarke has not been employed in football since.

Life outside football
From 1993 until he reached retirement age Clarke was a travelling salesman for MTS Nationwide, a firm based at Wakefield, West Yorkshire. He has, however, remained an outspoken critic of the game, and like all the Leeds United players of the Revie era, has remained fiercely protective of the reputation of both the manager and the club. He has suffered from arthritic knees in recent years.

Clarke now lives in Scunthorpe, Lincolnshire.

The Clarke footballing brothers
Allan was the second of five brothers to play the professional game – four of whom played for Walsall across three decades.
Frank was the only Clarke brother not to represent Walsall, playing for Shrewsbury Town, Queens Park Rangers, Ipswich Town and Carlisle United; Derek played for Walsall, Oxford United and Orient; Kelvin played for Walsall; and the youngest sibling, Wayne Clarke, played for Walsall towards the end of his career.

Career statistics

Honours
Leeds United
 Football League First Division: 1973–74
 FA Cup 1972; runner-up: 1970, 1973
 FA Charity Shield: 1969; runner-up: 1974
 Inter-Cities Fairs Cup: 1971
 European Cup runner-up: 1975

Leicester City
 FA Cup runner-up: 1969

Individual
PFA Team of the Year: 1973–74

References

External links
Full Managerial Stats for Leeds United from WAFLL
Soccerbase managerial statistics

English footballers
England international footballers
England under-23 international footballers
Walsall F.C. players
Fulham F.C. players
Leicester City F.C. players
Leeds United F.C. players
Barnsley F.C. players
Townsville Kern United players
English football managers
Barnsley F.C. managers
Leeds United F.C. managers
Lincoln City F.C. managers
Scunthorpe United F.C. managers
1970 FIFA World Cup players
People from Willenhall
1946 births
Living people
English Football League players
English Football League representative players
English Football League managers
Association football forwards
Sportspeople from Walsall
FA Cup Final players